Majordomo Records is an indie record label formed as an imprint of Shout! Factory, a Los Angeles-based audio/video label started by the founders of Rhino Records. The label's products are distributed through Sony BMG in the United States, Universal Music in Canada and Pinnacle in Europe. The imprint specializes in indie rock, alternative and punk music.

Artists signed with Majordomo Records

List includes artists previously signed with the label:

Chappo
Earlimart
The Von Bondies
Miles Kurosky

References

External links
Majordomo Records Official Website

American record labels